Goodenia phillipsiae is a species of flowering plant in the family Goodeniaceae and is endemic to a restricted area in the south-west of Western Australia. It is an erect to spreading, glabrous shrub with oblong to linear stem leaves and thyrses of yellow flowers.

Description
Flowering occurs around November.

Taxonomy and naming
The specific epithet (phillipsiae) honours the collector of the type specimens.

Distribution
This goodenia is only known from the type location.

Conservation status
Goodenia phillipsiae is classified as "Priority Four" by the Government of Western Australia Department of Parks and Wildlife, meaning that is rare or near threatened.

References

phillipsiae
Eudicots of Western Australia
Plants described in 1990
Taxa named by Roger Charles Carolin
Endemic flora of Western Australia